{{DISPLAYTITLE:C10H7Cl}}
The molecular formula C10H7Cl (molar mass: 162.62 g/mol, exact mass: 162.0236 u) may refer to:

 1-Chloronaphthalene
 2-Chloronaphthalene